Rosa D'Amato (born 30 March 1969 in Taranto) is an Italian politician who was first elected as a member of the European Parliament in 2014 and re-elected in 2019. She joined the Greens/EFA group in December 2020 together with her colleagues Ignazio Corrao, Eleonora Evi and Piernicola Pedicini.

References

1969 births
Living people
MEPs for Italy 2014–2019
MEPs for Italy 2019–2024
21st-century women MEPs for Italy
Five Star Movement MEPs